The City and Horses is an American indie pop band formed in Brooklyn in 2008. The members include flautist Domenica Fossati, drummer Chris Wirtalla, bassist Matt Manhire, lead guitarist Shane Connerty and synth/sax player Nikki D'Agostino, and singer/songwriter Marc Cantone. An indie band that performs pop songs with subject matter surrounding topics such as breakups and OCD breakdowns.  The debut album, I Don’t Want to Dream was released by White Shoe Records in 2009. The band has released 4 albums to date.

Prior to the album’s release, the song “I Miss It All” was handpicked by Charlyne Yi to be featured in her and Michael Cera’s indie film Paper Heart

The City and Horses were signed to the American label Paper Garden Records in 2010.

Members 
Current members
 Marc Cantone – singer & composer
 Domenica Fossati – flautist
 Chris Wirtalla – drummer
 Matt Manhire – bassist
 Shane Connerty – lead guitarist
 Nikki D'Agostino – synth & sax

Discography 
Studio albums
 Ruins - Paper Garden Records (2017)
 Strange Range - Paper Garden Records (2013)
 We Will Never Be Discovered - Paper Garden Records (2011)
 I Don’t Want to Dream - White Shoe Records (2009)

Music videos

 Re-Inking (2015)
 Pretty Pretty (2014)
 May I Love Someone Soon (2013)
 17 (2013)
 This Is Manhattan (2012)
 War Paint (2012)
 Dum Dee Dum – feat. Katie Costello (2011)
 We Will Never Be Discovered (2011)
 I Don't Want to Dream (2009)
 A Thousand Lashes (2009)

External links 
 Official Website
 Paper Garden Records

References 

Indie pop groups from New York (state)